Delphinium or Delphinion was a town of ancient Boeotia or of ancient Attica, the port-town of Oropus. Strabo, calls the harbour "sacred" and says it was opposite ancient Eretria in Euboea at a distance of 60 stadia; he places it at the beginning of Boeotia, 20 stadia from Oropus. Thucydides writes that during the last part of the Peloponnesian War, the port was fortified by the Athenians.

Its site is located near modern Kamaraki.

References

Populated places in ancient Attica
Populated places in ancient Boeotia
Former populated places in Greece